In economics, coordination goods are a form of good created by the coordination of people within civil society.

Coordination goods are non-rivalrous, but may be partially excludable through the means of withholding cooperation from a non-cooperative state.

See also 
 Public good
 Club good
 Collective action problem

References 

Goods (economics)
Civil society
Social economy